One Night at Budokan is a live album by Michael Schenker Group released in 1982. This album was recorded at Nippon Budokan in Tokyo, Japan as part of their 1981 tour.

Track listing

1982 original LP
All songs written by Michael Schenker and Gary Barden except where noted.

Side one
 "Armed and Ready" - 6:20
 "Cry for the Nations" - 5:32
 "Attack of the Mad Axeman" - 4:50
Side two
 "But I Want More" - 5:24
 "Victim of Illusion" - 6:18
 "Into the Arena" (Schenker) - 4:45
Side three
 "On and On" 5:32
 "Never Trust a Stranger" (Paul Raymond) - 6:07
 "Let Sleeping Dogs Lie" (Schenker, Barden, Chris Glen, Raymond, Cozy Powell) - 7:18
Side four
 "Courvoisier Concerto" (Schenker, Raymond) - 3:42
 "Lost Horizons" - 7:22
 "Doctor Doctor" (Schenker, Phil Mogg) - 5:30
 "Ready to Rock" - 7:10

2009 Remastered Edition with bonus tracks
Disc 1
 "Intro: "Ride of the Valkyries" from act 3 of Die Walküre (Richard Wagner)" - 1:31*
 "Armed and Ready" - 4:52
 "Cry for the Nations" - 5:30
 "Attack of the Mad Axeman" - 5:04
 "But I Want More" - 7:22
 "Victim of Illusion" - 6:14
 "Into the Arena" (Schenker) - 4:54
Disc 2
 "On and On" - 5:35
 "Never Trust a Stranger" (Paul Raymond) - 5:36
 "Let Sleeping Dogs Lie" (Schenker, Barden, Chris Glen, Raymond, Cozy Powell) - 7:17
 "Tales of Mystery" - 3:50 (*)
 "Cozy Powell Drum Solo" (Cozy Powell) - 11:23  (*)
 "Courvoisier Concerto" (Schenker, Raymond) - 3:35
 "Lost Horizons" - 7:30
 "Doctor Doctor" (Schenker, Phil Mogg) - 6:18
 "Ready to Rock" - 6:39

(*)Bonus Tracks not featured on original LP

Personnel
Michael Schenker – lead guitar
Gary Barden – vocals
Paul Raymond – keyboards, rhythm guitars, backing vocals
Cozy Powell – drums
Chris Glen – bass

Production
Producer – MSG, David Wooley and David Kirkwood
Recorded at The Nippon Budokan on August 12, 1981
Mixed at Air Studios, London

Charts

Certifications

References 

Michael Schenker Group albums
1981 live albums
Chrysalis Records live albums
Albums recorded at the Nippon Budokan